194th may refer to:

194th Armored Brigade (United States), assigned to the US Army's Combat Developments Command to test new materiel at Fort Ord, California
194th Battalion (Edmonton Highlanders), CEF, a unit in the Canadian Expeditionary Force during the First World War
194th Engineer Brigade (United States), a combat engineer brigade of the United States Army based at Jackson, Tennessee
194th Fighter Squadron, an aviation unit of the California Air National Guard
194th Intelligence Squadron, an intelligence unit of the United States Air Force
194th Ohio Infantry (or 194th OVI), an infantry regiment in the Union Army during the American Civil War
194th Regional Support Wing, a unit located at Camp Murray, Washington

See also
194 (number)
194, the year 194 (CXCIV) of the Julian calendar
194 BC